Low-tide elevation is a naturally formed area of land which is above water and
surrounded by water at low tide but submerged at high tide. It may be a mudflat or reef.

Legal status 
Low tide elevations may be used as basepoints for the calculation of maritime zones unless they lie at a distance exceeding the breadth of the territorial sea (12-miles) from the nearest mainland or island.

References

See also
 Territorial waters
 Exclusive economic zone
 Continental shelf
 International waters
 United Nations Convention on the Law of the Sea

Hydrography
Law of the sea